Hellenic Orthodox Church of the Annunciation, formerly known as North Presbyterian Church, is a historic Greek Orthodox church located at Buffalo in Erie County, New York.  It is a Gothic Revival-style church designed by Boston architect George F. Newton and constructed in 1906, as home to North Presbyterian Church.  In 1952, the church became the Hellenic Orthodox Church of the Annunciation.

It was listed on the National Register of Historic Places in 2002.

References

20th-century Eastern Orthodox church buildings
Churches in Buffalo, New York
Gothic Revival church buildings in New York (state)
Eastern Orthodox churches in the United States
European-American culture in Buffalo, New York
Churches on the National Register of Historic Places in New York (state)
Churches completed in 1906
National Register of Historic Places in Buffalo, New York
Former Presbyterian churches in New York (state)
Greek Orthodox churches in the United States
1906 establishments in New York (state)